Moravany is a municipality and village in Pardubice District in the Pardubice Region of the Czech Republic. It has about 1,800 inhabitants.

Administrative parts
Villages of Čeradice, Moravanský, Platěnice, Platěnsko and Turov are administrative parts of Moravany.

Geography
It lies in the East Elbe Table, on the edge of the Polabí region. The river Loučná flows through the municipality. The flooded quarry called Duhový Pond is located north of the village of Moravany.

History
The first written mention of Moravany is from 1244, when there already was a stronghold with a small settlement around it. In the 16th and 17th century there were many ponds but they were later dried during the German colonization and during the reign of Joseph II in 1782 they were turned into arable and given to settlers, mainly to the German ones.

In 1806 the Crown Prince passed through Moravany, later known as the Emperor Ferdinand I of Austria. The settlers solicited designation of a priest and the building of a rectory although the foundation of a new church had been laid down in 1782 after the old one had burned to the ground. The rectory was then built in 1808. There were two bells in the steeple until the 1816 when one of them was taken away for military purposes. The church as it stands now was built in the 1920s in the place of the burned church.

The railway was built in 1845.

Transport
Moravany lies on the railway intersection of the railroads Prague–Česká Třebová (main Czech railway corridor) and Chrudim–Borohrádek.

Sights
The most significant monument is the Church of Saints Peter and Paul. It is a late Baroque building from 1782. It includes a fresco of the coronation of the Virgin Mary by Josef Kramolín.

The 50th parallel passes through Moravany. It is marked with a plaque on the Hrdinů Square.

References

External links

 

Moravany